Every Where Is Some Where is the second and major label debut studio album by American alternative hip hop recording artist K.Flay. The album was released on April 7, 2017 by Interscope Records and Dan Reynolds' imprint Night Street Records, being the first artist signed to the latter as well as the first album released. The album is preceded by the singles "Blood In the Cut", "Black Wave" and "High Enough". The tracks "Blood in the Cut", "Dreamers", "You Felt Right" and "Hollywood Forever" were previously released on the Crush Me EP.

In popular culture
"Blood in the Cut" is featured in the Bojack Horseman episode "Stupid Piece of Sh*t", the announcement trailer for Forza Motorsport 7, the pilot episode of Impulse, the Animal Kingdom episode "Forgive Us Our Trespasses", and in the Billions episode "Redemption".
"Black Wave" is featured in the racing games Need for Speed Payback and Asphalt 9: Legends, along with the trailer for Assassination Nation.
"High Enough" is featured in the Riverdale episode, "Chapter Nineteen: Death Proof".
"Giver" is featured in the Riverdale episode, "Chapter Fifty: American Dreams".

Reception

At Metacritic, which assigns a normalized rating out of 100 to reviews from mainstream publications, it received an average score of 67, based on 5 reviews.

The album received two nominations for the 2018 Grammy Awards, for Best Engineered Album, Non-Classical and for Best Rock Song ("Blood in the Cut").

Track listing 
Credits taken from Qobuz.

Charts

References

2017 albums
Interscope Records albums
K.Flay albums